Pseudmelisa is a genus of moths in the family Erebidae.

Species
 Pseudmelisa chalybsa Hampson, 1910
 Pseudmelisa demiavis Kaye, 1919
 Pseudmelisa rubrosignata Kiriakoff, 1957

References

Natural History Museum Lepidoptera generic names catalog

Syntomini
Moth genera